The 2020 East Carolina Pirates football team represented East Carolina University in the 2020 NCAA Division I FBS football season. The Pirates, led by second-year head coach Mike Houston, played their home games at Dowdy–Ficklen Stadium as members of the American Athletic Conference.

Previous season

The Pirates finished the 2019 season 4–8, 1–7 in AAC play to finish in fifth place in the East Division.

Schedule
East Carolina had games scheduled against Marshall, Norfolk State, and South Carolina, which was canceled due to the COVID-19 pandemic.

Schedule Source:

Game summaries

UCF

at Georgia State

at South Florida

Navy

at Tulsa

Tulane

at Cincinnati

at Temple

SMU

Players drafted into the NFL

References

East Carolina
East Carolina Pirates football seasons
East Carolina Pirates football